José Omar Pastoriza (23 May 1942 – 2 August 2004) was a football player and manager. A midfielder, he played for Independiente, AS Monaco, and the Argentina national team. As a manager, he managed the Venezuela national team among other teams.

Playing career
El Pato ("The Duck") Pastoriza was born in Rosario, and started his career in Rosario Central, but gained renown with Colón de Santa Fe. He moved to Racing Club, but was transferred to rival Independiente after 53 matches due to a poor team performance and the precarious economic situation. He stayed six years with Independiente, winning three first division tournaments and a Copa Libertadores. In 1971, he was awarded the Olimpia de Oro, which is given to the Argentine footballer of the year.

After the 1972 season he transferred to Ligue 1 AS Monaco, where he retired as a player.

Coaching career
Having good relations with players, El Pato Patoriza coached the a number of clubs in Argentina, Colombia, Brazil, Bolivia and Spain, as well as the El Salvador and Venezuela national teams. Pastoriza began his managerial career in 1976 with Independiente, the club where he won another three national leagues, another Libertadores Cup and the Intercontinental Cup in 1984. He also worked as the manager of Talleres de Córdoba on many occasions. He had a single stint as manager of several Argentine clubs such as Racing Club, Boca Juniors and Argentinos Juniors.

Pastoriza's first foreign appointment was in 1982, at the Colombian Club Deportivo Los Millonarios. He was manager of Brazilian team Fluminense (1985) before returning to Argentina.

In 1992, he worked as manager of the Spanish Atlético Madrid, and in 1994 he worked with Bolivian Club Bolívar. Pastoriza served as the coach of the El Salvador national team between 1995 and 1996 and as the coach of Venezuela between 1998 and 2000.

In 2004, he died in Buenos Aires during his fifth stint as manager of Independiente. He had a heart attack at his apartment, and the emergency doctors could not save him. Pastoriza had a history of health problems, but kept smoking anyway. The funeral was performed at the Independiente headquarters.

Jairo Castillo, player of Independiente, was repeatedly booked by the referee in later games for removing his shirt to reveal tributes to Pastoriza. As a result, it was decided to add Pastoriza's nickname "Pato" to the official Independiente kit in 2004.

Career statistics

Club

International

Honours

Player
Independiente
Argentine Primera División: Nacional 1967, Metropolitano 1970, Metropolitano 1971
Copa Libertadores: 1972

Individual
Footballer of the Year of Argentina: 1971

Manager
Independiente
Argentine Primera División: Nacional 1977, Nacional 1978, Metropolitano 1983
Copa Libertadores: 1984
Intercontinental Cup: 1984

References

External links

 
Short Biography 

1942 births
2004 deaths
Argentine footballers
Footballers from Rosario, Santa Fe
Association football midfielders
Argentina international footballers
1966 FIFA World Cup players
Argentine Primera División players
Ligue 1 players
Rosario Central footballers
Club Atlético Colón footballers
Racing Club de Avellaneda footballers
Club Atlético Independiente footballers
AS Monaco FC players
Argentine football managers
1999 Copa América managers
Club Atlético Independiente managers
Talleres de Córdoba managers
Racing Club de Avellaneda managers
Millonarios F.C. managers
Fluminense FC managers
Boca Juniors managers
Atlético Madrid managers
Club Bolívar managers
Argentinos Juniors managers
El Salvador national football team managers
Venezuela national football team managers
Argentine expatriate footballers
Argentine expatriate football managers
Argentine expatriate sportspeople in Monaco
Expatriate footballers in Monaco
Expatriate footballers in France
Argentine expatriate sportspeople in Colombia
Expatriate football managers in Colombia
Argentine expatriate sportspeople in El Salvador
Expatriate football managers in El Salvador
Argentine expatriate sportspeople in Venezuela
Expatriate football managers in Venezuela